Charles Richard Jeremy Elwes (born 15 July 1997) is a British rower.

In 2021, Elwes won a European gold medal in the eight in Varese, Italy.

In 2022, Elwes won a European gold medal in the eight in Munich, Germany. 

Elwes won a bronze medal competing in eight  at  2020 Summer Olympics in Tokyo.

Elwes was a member of Oxford crew who won The Boat Race 2022. He is studying medical ethics.

References

External links

1997 births
Living people
British male rowers
Rowers at the 2020 Summer Olympics
Medalists at the 2020 Summer Olympics
Olympic medalists in rowing
Olympic bronze medallists for Great Britain
Alumni of Oriel College, Oxford
People educated at Radley College
World Rowing Championships medalists for Great Britain
21st-century British people